The following is a list of the tallest buildings by U.S. state and territory.  Forty are in their state's largest city, and 18 are in their capital city. The tallest building in the U.S. by architectural height is currently Central Park Tower in New York, which is approximately —more than the combined heights of the tallest buildings in Wyoming, Vermont, Maine, South Dakota, Montana, North Dakota, New Hampshire, and West Virginia.  Many are attributed to banks: three to JPMorgan Chase and U.S. Bancorp, and two to Wells Fargo and Bank of America.



Current tallest building in each state, territory or district

Tallest buildings proposed or under construction 

These future buildings, if completed, would overtake the title of the tallest building in their respective states.

Method of determination 
The building heights compared here are calculated from the ground level to the architectural top and include heights of all habitable structures irrespective of number of occupied floors.  Non-freestanding structures, observational towers, and communication towers are excluded (North Dakota boasts the largest guyed mast structure in the world), as are antennas extending from the structure top. However integral spires are included, facilitating One World Trade Center to be considered taller than Willis Tower, even though the highest occupied floor of Willis Tower is higher than that of One World Trade Center. The Council on Tall Buildings and Urban Habitat is considered the arbiter for any dispute. For more information, see building heights.

See also
List of tallest buildings in the United States
List of tallest buildings in the world
List of tallest structures in the United States

Notes

References

 
 
Tallest Buildings